Maria Armida Parale Perez-Castillo (born September 5, 1969), known professionally as Amy Perez-Castillo or Tyang Amy, is a Filipino TV and radio presenter, entrepreneur and occasional actress.

Recognized as a veteran television host in the Philippines, Perez has won “Best Female Morning Show Host” at the 6th Paragala Central Luzon Media Awards. In 2017, she won “Best Morning Show Host” award for Umagang Kay Ganda at the 31st PMPC Star Awards for Television. In 2021, she took home “Best Female TV Host” at the 34th PMPC Star Awards for Television.

She began her career in show business as an actress in 1984. Prior to beginning her hosting career, she made appearances in films including Campus Beat and Jack & Jill. Early in the 1990s, when she hosted Sang Linggo nAPO Sila, which was swiftly followed by Magandang Tanghali Bayan, she received her biggest break as a host. Perez also appeared on television with her role as Amelia in the long-running sitcom Palibhasa Lalaki as one of her most memorable roles. 

Since 2016, Perez is one of the main host of It's Showtime, which marked her comeback as a noontime show host.

Career
Perez' earliest big-time gig was co-hosting the noontime variety programs Family Kuarta o Kahon (1986–1990), Eat Bulaga! (1989–1995), Sa Linggo nAPO Sila (1990–1995), 'Sang Linggo nAPO Sila (1995–1998), and Magandang Tanghali Bayan from 1998 until she left in 2002. After two years to quit hosting variety shows, she was chosen to be one of the hosts for the morning talk-variety show M.R.S..

As an actress, Amy Perez played a variety of roles in television and films. She took the role of Anne in Anak ni Baby Ama and also appeared in Flavor of the Month, starring Joey Marquez and Alma Moreno. It was in these movies that she was discovered to have much flair for comedy. Perez' performance as Helen in the Robin Padilla-starrer Sa Diyos Lang Ako Susuko is one of the roles for which she received critical acclaim. She also starred in Petrang Kabayo 2: Ang Ganda-Ganda Ko, Palibhasa Lalake, Ipagpatawad Mo, Tigasin and Pera o Bayong (Not da TV). She appeared in television dramas like Sa Dulo Ng Walang Hanggan in which she played the role of Mirriam, Habang Kapiling Ka as Divine Ogata and Ikaw sa Puso Ko in 2004. Moreover, she appeared in the two episodes of Komiks in 2006: 1. Alpha Omega Girl; 2. Agua Bendita. There was also a segment entitled Kama in a horror flick directed by Jose Javier Reyes Matakot Ka sa Karma in which she took the role of Myrna. She was also a star in an episode of Love Spell: "Shoes ko po, Shoes ko Day!" just last 2007 and she was a character in I've Fallen for You, which she played Ninang Beth.

Personal life
Perez and musician Brix Ferraris have a son named Adi. She is a cousin of veteran actress Lorna Tolentino. She filed for annulment from Ferraris but was denied by the Supreme Court. Perez then met her current partner, radio host Carlo Castillo. They have a son together born in 2008. In 2012, Perez was confirmed to be 3 months pregnant, her second child to Castillo, and she confirmed that she was to take a 1-year leave from Face to Face.

Filmography

Film
Campus Beat (1984) – Annie
Jack & Jill (1987) – Bridesmaid
Bobo Cop (1988)
Sa Diyos Lang Ako Susuko (1989)
Anak ni Baby Ama (1990)
Flavor of the Month (1990)
Sa Diyos Lang Ako Susuko (1990) – Helen
Petrang Kabayo 2 (Anong Ganda Mo! Mukha Kang Kabayo) (1990) – Marianne
Ipagpatawad Mo (1991)
Kaputol ng Isang Awit (1991) – Margaux Vicencio
Darna (1991)
Nag-iisang Bituin (1994)
Oo Na, Sige Na (1994) – Nina Bermudez
Batang-X (1995)
Tigasin (1999)
Pera o Bayong: Not da TV (2000) – Lola/Host
Matakot Ka sa Karma (2006) – Myrna
I've Fallen for You (2007) – Ninang Beth
Si Agimat at si Enteng Kabisote (2010) – Ina Magenta
Enteng Ng Ina Mo (2011) – Ina Magenta
Si Agimat, si Enteng Kabisote at si Ako (2012) – Ina Magenta

Television
{| class="wikitable"
! Year !! Title !! Role
|-
| 2016–present || It's Showtime || Herself / Additional Main Host 
|-
| 2014–present || Sakto || Herself / Main Host 
|-
| 2013–2015 || The Singing Bee || Herself / Host
|- 
| 2013–2020 || Umagang Kay Ganda || Herself / Host
|-
| rowspan="2"| 2012–2013 || Good Morning Club ||rowspan="3"| Herself / Host
|-
| Ang Latest
|-
| rowspan="2"| 2010–2012 || Sapul sa Singko
|-
| Untold Stories Mula Sa Face To Face || Herself / Host
|-
| 2010–2011 || Juicy! || Herself / Guest Panelists 
|- 
| 2010–2013 || Face to Face || Herself / Host 
|-
| 2009 || Only You || Emily
|-
| rowspan="2"|2006 || Gulong ng Palad || Lorraine Pineda 
|-
| Love Spell: Shoes Ko Po, Shoes Ko Day! || Various
|-
| 2006–2010 || Kabuhayang Swak na Swak || rowspan="3"| Herself / Host
|-
| 2005 ||  M.R.S. 
|-
| 2004–2005 || Diretsahan
|-
| rowspan="2"|2004 || Leya, ang Pinakamagandang Babae sa Ilalim ng Lupa || Maruba
|-
| Ikaw sa Puso Ko || Various
|-
| 2002–2003 || Habang Kapiling Ka || Divine Ogata 
|-
| 2002 || Wansapanataym: Ang Pilyo at Ang Pilya || Susan
|- 
| 2001 ||  Sa Dulo ng Walang Hanggan || Mirriam
|- 
| 1998–2003 || Magandang Tanghali Bayan || rowspan="3"| Herself / Host
|-
| 1995–1998 || 'Sang Linggo nAPO Sila 
|-
| 1990–1995 || Sa Linggo nAPO Sila|-
| rowspan="2"|1987–1988 || Kalatog Pinggan || Herself / Co-Host
|-
| Palibhasa Lalake || Amy / Amelia 
|-
| 1988–1995 || Eat Bulaga! || Herself / Co-Host
|- 
| 1986–1990 ||  Family Kuarta o Kahon || Herself / Co-Host
|}

Radio showsSakto (DZMM) (2014–2020) (co-host with Marc Logan "2014–2018"; co-host with Kim Atienza "2018–2020")A.M.Y. (About Me & You) (DZMM) (2006–2010)Ah OA (Amy and Hans On-Air) (Radyo5 92.3 News FM, now 92.3 Radyo5 True FM) Amy Perez on Radio Romance 101.9'' (101.9 Radio Romance, now MOR 101.9) (1989–1991)

Accolades

Notes

References

External links

1969 births
Living people
ABS-CBN personalities
Actresses from Metro Manila
Ateneo de Manila University alumni
Filipino film actresses
Filipino people of Spanish descent
Filipino television variety show hosts
Filipino television talk show hosts
People from Las Piñas
TV5 (Philippine TV network) personalities